Glutamate [NMDA] receptor subunit epsilon-1 is a protein that in humans is encoded by the GRIN2A gene. With 1464 amino acids, the canonical GluN2A subunit isoform is large. GluN2A-short isoforms specific to primates can be produced by alternative splicing and contain 1281 amino acids.

Function 

N-methyl-D-aspartate (NMDA) receptors are a class of ionotropic glutamate receptors.  NMDA channel has been shown to be involved in long-term potentiation, an activity-dependent increase in the efficiency of synaptic transmission thought to underlie certain kinds of memory and learning.  NMDA receptor channels are heteromers composed of the key receptor subunit NMDAR1 (GRIN1) and 1 or more of the 4 NMDAR2 subunits: NMDAR2A (GRIN2A), NMDAR2B (GRIN2B), NMDAR2C (GRIN2C), and NMDAR2D (GRIN2D).

Associations 

Variants of the gene are associated with the protective effect of coffee on Parkinson's disease.

Mutations in GRIN2A are associated to refractory epilepsy.

Whole exome/genome sequencing has led to the discovery of an association between mutations in GRIN2A and a wide variety of neurological diseases, including epilepsy, intellectual disability, autism spectrum disorders, developmental delay, and schizophrenia.

Interactions 

GRIN2A has been shown to interact with:
 DLG1 
 DLG3 
 DLG4 
 FYN 
 Interleukin 16
 PTK2B
 Src

See also 
 Glutamate receptor
 NMDA receptor

References

Further reading 

 
 
 
 
 
 
 
 
 
 
 
 
 
 
 
 
 
 
 
 

Ionotropic glutamate receptors